Zehra Önay Alpago (born 1947) is a Turkish female jurist, politician, former government minister and academic.

Private life
Zehra Önay Alpago was born in Karadeniz Ereğli of Zonguldak Province, northwestern Turkey in 1947. She graduated from Ankara University, Law School in 1969.

After having left the politics, she has been working as a lawyer and serving as an academic at Yeditepe University. As of end 2010, Alpago was elected into the Union of Turkish Bar Associations as a delegate of Bar of Istanbul.

She is married to physician Yıldırım Alpago. She is mother of two.

Politics
Alpago entered politics from the 1983-established Social Democratic Populist Party (SHP), and served two terms as the first ever chairwoman of the party's district branch. She later became a member of the central executive board and vice chairperson of the SHP.

Alpago was appointed from outside the parliament Minister of State responsible for "women, Family and Social Policies" on July 27, 1994, succeeding Türkân Akyol. She served at this post in the 50th government led by female Prime Minister of Turkey Tansu Çiller. On March 27, 1995, she left her post to Aysel Baykal of the Republican People's Party (CHP) when the SHP merged with the CHP.

References

Living people
1947 births
People from Karadeniz Ereğli
Ankara University Faculty of Law alumni
Turkish jurists
Social Democratic Populist Party (Turkey) politicians
Women government ministers of Turkey
Government ministers of Turkey
Members of the 50th government of Turkey
Ministers of State of Turkey
Republican People's Party (Turkey) politicians
Turkish women academics
Academic staff of Yeditepe University
20th-century Turkish women politicians